The Davidson Lake Shelter Cabin is a historic three-sided log shelter located near Davidson Lake in the Admiralty Island National Monument.  The structure was built in the 1930s by a crew of the Civilian Conservation Corps, a Great Depression-era works project of the United States government.  The basic superstructure of the shelter is made of peeled logs, and the roof and walls are composed of wooden shakes (no longer original).  It is one of a series of CCC-built shelters along the Admiralty Island Canoe Route.

The cabin was listed on the National Register of Historic Places in 1995.

See also
National Register of Historic Places listings in Hoonah–Angoon Census Area, Alaska

References

Buildings and structures completed in 1935
Civilian Conservation Corps in Alaska
Log cabins in the United States
Buildings and structures on the National Register of Historic Places in Hoonah–Angoon Census Area, Alaska
Park buildings and structures on the National Register of Historic Places in Alaska
Tongass National Forest
Log buildings and structures on the National Register of Historic Places in Alaska
1935 establishments in Alaska